Josselin Ouanna was the defending champion, but withdrew from the tournament due to illness.
Jesse Huta Galung defeated Vincent Millot 6–1, 6–3 in the final to win the title.

Seeds

Draw

Finals

Top half

Bottom half

References
 Main Draw
 Qualifying Draw

Challenger La Manche - Singles
2013 Singles